The Gibraltar Group of sixth rates were basically repeats of the Maidstone Group. Ten ships were ordered with one of a slightly different design (but basically the same) and another added in 1711, for a total of twelve vessels. Their armament was similar as were the dimensions of the vessels. They were constructed between 1710 and 1716.

Design and specifications
The construction of the vessels was assigned to Royal dockyards. As with most vessels of this time period only order and launch dates are available. The dimensional data listed here is the specification data and the acceptable design creep will be listed on each individual vessel. The tonnage calculation would be 276 tons.

The gun armament as established in 1703 would be twenty 6-pounder 19 hundredweight (cwt) guns mounted on wooden trucks on the upper deck (UD) with four 4-pounder 12 cwt guns on the quarterdeck (QD). The 4-pounders would be removed in 1714.

Ships of the Gibraltar Group

Citations

References
 Winfield 2009, British Warships in the Age of Sail (1603 – 1714), by Rif Winfield, published by Seaforth Publishing, England © 2009, EPUB , Chapter 6, The Sixth Rates, Vessels acquired from 2 May 1660, Gibraltar Group
 Winfield 2007, British Warships in the Age of Sail (1714 – 1792), by Rif Winfield, published by Seaforth Publishing, England © 2007, EPUB , Chapter 6, Sixth Rates, Sixth Rates of 20 or 24 guns, Vessels in Service at 1 August 1714, Gibraltar Group
 Colledge, Ships of the Royal Navy, by J.J. Colledge, revised and updated by Lt Cdr Ben Warlow and Steve Bush, published by Seaforth Publishing, Barnsley, Great Britain, © 2020, EPUB 

 

Corvettes of the Royal Navy
Ships of the Royal Navy
1700s ships